Federico Hidalgo is a filmmaker, film director and film professor in Montreal, Quebec, Canada.<ref>T'Cha Dunlevy, "So, what's it really about? Hidalgo's tale of couples starting a mysterious business is offbeat and ambiguous". Montreal Gazette, August 10, 2012.</ref> He has directed five feature-length, fiction films to date: A Silent Love (2004), Imitation (2006), The Skeptic (L'Incrédule) (2012), Le Concierge (2014) and The Great Traveller (2019), as well as a feature-length documentary, New Tricks (2009). All five of these films were produced by Atopia (film studio).A Silent Love, co-written with his wife Paulina Robles, was nominated for a Genie Award for best original screenplay and was accepted to the Sundance Film Festival. It also won the Best Screenplay Award at 2004 Brooklyn International Film Festival. Variety'' wrote that the film "offers a diverting spin on the mail-order-bride premise, making a charming feature debut for writer-director Federico Hidalgo and co-writer Paulina Robles (Hidalgo's wife)."

Hidalgo is both a graduate of and professor at the Concordia University Mel Hoppenheim School of Cinema, as well as a part-time professor in the department of communication studies.

References

External links
 
 Atopia Web site biography

Film directors from Montreal
Concordia University alumni
Academic staff of Concordia University
Canadian people of Argentine descent
Year of birth missing (living people)
Living people
Canadian film educators
21st-century Canadian screenwriters
21st-century Canadian male writers
Canadian male screenwriters